Zachar is both a given name and a surname of jewish origin. Notable people with the name include:

Zachar Šybieka (born 1948), Belarusian historian
Imre Zachár (1890–1954), Hungarian water polo player
Jacob Zachar (born 1986), American actor
Ján Zachar (born 1936), Slovak football coach
Karol Zachar (1918–2003), Slovak director